Corey Glover (born November 6, 1964) is an American singer, guitarist and actor. He is the lead vocalist of the rock band Living Colour and has toured as the vocalist for the funk band Galactic. As an actor, he played Francis in the 1986 war movie Platoon.

Career
Glover was born in Brooklyn, New York City. He was an aspiring actor when guitarist Vernon Reid drafted him into Living Colour in 1985, reportedly after seeing Glover singing "Happy Birthday" at a friend's party. He had appeared in a recruiting commercial for the United States Army, as Pvt. Francis in Oliver Stone's Vietnam war film, Platoon, and starred in a short-lived television series called Signs of Life. He has also hosted various shows on VH1.

Living Colour found immediate success with the release of their debut album, Vivid in 1988. It eventually went platinum in April 1989 and again five years later. The album's single "Cult of Personality" won the 1989 Grammy Award for Best Hard Rock Performance and the band was named Best New Artist at the MTV Video Music Awards. Living Colour released two more albums (Time's Up and Stain) before splitting up in 1995. After the split, Glover started a solo career as Reverend Daddy Love and formed the band Vice with guitarist Mike Ciro.

In 1995, Glover participated with an ensemble of notable vocalists, guitarists, bassists, and drummers, including the London Metropolitan Orchestra, to record a Jimi Hendrix tribute album named In From The Storm.  Glover provided the vocals for tracks 7 and 8, which were In From The Storm (title track) and Drifting.

Living Colour reunited on December 21, 2000 at CBGB's during a set by Will Calhoun and Doug Wimbish's live drum 'n' bass duo, Headfake. Glover guested on three songs, and Vernon Reid joined them three songs into the set. The reunion was followed by the release of the band's fourth studio album Collideøscope in October 2003.

In August 2006, Glover began co-headlining a national tour of Jesus Christ Superstar, playing the role of Judas Iscariot opposite Ted Neeley. He took the place of singer Carl Anderson, who had played Judas since 1971 alongside Neeley and was set to reprise the role, but had died of leukemia in 2004. The tour ran through 2010. Glover told Neeley that when he was a child, seeing the movie version of the show was what made him decide to be an entertainer. In June 2008, Glover left the show to rejoin with Living Colour and to work on the next CD.

Also in a major 2006 performance, Glover sang "Superstar" (from the musical Jesus Christ Superstar) at the 29th Kennedy Center Honors to its composer, honoree Andrew Lloyd Webber.

On September 15, 2009, Living Colour released their fifth studio album, The Chair in the Doorway.

In 2010, Glover began touring as the vocalist for the band Galactic.

In 2011, Glover decided, through the use of Pledgemusic to ask fans to participate in a follow-up to Hymns. Instead of going through a corporate entity and record executives, Glover asked fans to help fund his next recording, to be released by late 2012.

Glover toured North America in 2012 with Galactic and Soul Rebels Brass Band.  On March 29, 2012, the two bands appeared on the late night talk show Conan on TBS.

In November 2012, Glover released The Pledge through Pledgemusic – a Direct-To-Fan Project, which offers various incentives at different prices, as well as access to Pledger-Only items.

In 2015, he appeared on two tracks on indie rapper and producer Decora's debut solo record Bread and Oats. Glover's mind-expanding contributions included "Nantucket," a break-up track with his “I met this girl from Nantucket / She will electrify your mind” phasing in and out over bird calls and flutes, and "Beautiful Bitch," a 7-minute epic with him intoning “why you such a beautiful bitch” over a spaced instrumental reminiscent of Mozart by way of Nine Inch Nails.

In 2018 Glover teamed up with guitarist George Lynch, drummer Chris Moore, and bassist Pancho Tomaselli to form the rock group Ultraphonix. He also formed a new metal project called Disciples of Verity, with an album coming in 2020.

Discography

With Living Colour

Solo
 In From the Storm - The Music of Jimi Hendrix (1995)
Sonic Adventure Remix (1998)
 Hymns (1998)
 Live at CBGB's 12/4/97 (1998)
 Live at Wetland (1999)
 The Pledge (2012)

With Ultraphonix
 Original Human Music (2018)

With Disciples of Verity
 Pragmatic Sanction (2020)

Stage work

Fallen Angel (1994)
Jesus Christ Superstar – Judas Iscariot (2006–2008)

References

External links
 Official Corey Glover @Facebook
 Corey Glover Pledgemusic project
 Corey Glover @ Myspace
 
 Corey Glover interview at Allaboutjazz.com
 Corey sits down with Ira Haberman of The Sound Podcast for a feature interview

20th-century American male actors
20th-century American singers
21st-century American male actors
21st-century American singers
African-American male actors
20th-century African-American male singers
African-American rock singers
Alternative metal musicians
American heavy metal singers
American male film actors
American male stage actors
American male television actors
American tenors
Dowling College alumni
Living Colour members
Living people
Male actors from New York City
Musicians from Brooklyn
Singers from New York City
20th-century American male singers
21st-century American male singers
Galactic members
1964 births
21st-century African-American male singers